Irfan Ahmed (born 20 November 1989) is a Pakistani-born international cricketer who has played four One Day Internationals and three Twenty20 Internationals for Hong Kong.

In January 2016 he was provisionally suspended by the International Cricket Council after a breach of their Anti-Corruption Code. In April he was the ICC suspended him for two years and six months, following his admission to the charge. In October 2018, he was charged with a further nine offences under the ICC Anti-Corruption Code. In August 2019, the ICC banned him for life from all forms of cricket. The majority of the offences related to matches played by Hong Kong against Canada and Scotland during the 2014 Cricket World Cup Qualifier tournament in New Zealand.

See also
 List of cricketers banned for corruption

References

External links 
 

1989 births
Living people
Hong Kong cricketers
Hong Kong One Day International cricketers
Hong Kong Twenty20 International cricketers
Cricketers at the 2010 Asian Games
Pakistani emigrants to Hong Kong
Cricketers at the 2014 Asian Games
Sportspeople of Pakistani descent
Cricketers from Islamabad
Asian Games competitors for Hong Kong
Sportspeople banned for life